Mellowdrone is an American rock band from Los Angeles, formed in 1999.

Biography
Mellowdrone originated as Jonathan Bates' solo project, but expanded to a full band with Tony DeMatteo (guitar and keyboards), Scott Ellis (drums) and Greg Griffith (bass). Griffith and Ellis were later replaced by Camila Gutierrez and Brian Borg respectively. The band's music encompasses a range of styles from lo-fi, indie rock and experimental.

Their debut album, Box, was released in 2006 on Columbia Records. Shortly after, Gutierrez formed Uh Huh Her and left Mellowdrone. The band continued as a three-piece, with Bates taking over as bassist. Their follow-up album, Angry Bear, was released in 2009 on Coming Home Records.

Mellowdrone's music has appeared on several television shows, including Project Runway, Six Feet Under, and Cane.  "C'Mon Try A Little Bit" was featured in the opening scene of Driv3r. Their song "Oh My" was featured on the FIFA 07 soundtrack and the horror movie Prom Night. "Fashionably Uninvited" was included in the soundtrack for the 2007 film The Invisible. "Orange Marmalade" was featured in the 2008 film Never Back Down and in the film Fling. "Beautiful Day" was featured on Project Gotham Racing 2.

After becoming frustrated with the logistics of a full band, Jonathan Bates began a solo project in 2010, dubbed Big Black Delta. He has also played as a touring musician for M83.

In 2017, members of The Neighbourhood who were fans of Mellowdrone contacted Jonathan and Tony for a collaboration. Both members accepted, leading to them meeting for the first time in eight years. The two were inspired to start writing songs together again, and Mellowdrone was eventually revived as a band, producing an EP in 2018.

Discography

...Boredom Never Sounded So Sweet
EP (1999)
[48-17-6]
Ride (Finish Me Off)
Bitelip
My First Love Song
Monsters
Justine
Spoiled Boy
Happy Together

Glassblower
EP (2001)
 Fall On Your Knees
 You And I
 Glassblower
 It All Makes Sense Now
 #3

A Demonstration of Intellectual Property
EP (2003)
 Tinylittle
 Fashionably Uninvited
 And Repeat
 No More Options
 Ridealong
 Beautiful Day
 Bitelip

Go Get 'Em Tiger
EP (2004)
 Bonemarrow
 Worst Song Ever
 Motivation
 I'm Too Young
 Pretty Boy
 Anglophile

Box
(2006)
 C'Mon Try A Little Bit
 Oh My
 Four Leaf Clover
 Fashionably Uninvited
 Beautiful Day
 Fuck It Man
 Whatever The Deal
 Madison
 And Repeat
 Orange Marmalade
 Amazing
 Bone Marrow
 Limb To Limb

Maquina 7"
(2008)
 Maquina
 Machine (En Espanol)
 Settle the Hum (B-Side)
 Wouldn't Mind (B-Side)

Angry Bear
(2009)
 Wherever You May Go
 Elephant
 Alone=In Your Face
 Esmeralda
 Big Winner
 Sugar
 Drinking Song
 Lady in Her Underwear
 Logged Hours
 Button
 Jumping Off the Pier
 DMT

2018
EP (2018)
 I Don't Believe It
 Way Out

3
EP (2018)
 Let It Out
 Pascal's Wager
 I Forgive You

References

External links
 Mellowdrone website

Rock music groups from California
Musical groups from Los Angeles
Electronic music groups from California
Lo-fi music groups